Uraz Turakulov (born January 28, 1963, Tajikistan) is Tajikistani football coach.

Coaching career

As one of the most successful coaches from Tajikistan, he won the Tajik League twice with Vakhsh Qurghonteppa in 1997 and 2005; also won Tajik Cup in 1997 and 2008. He also achieved Runner Up in AFC President's Cup in 2006.

Honours

Merited Coach of the Republic of Tajikistan
Best Coach of Tajikistan (2003, 2005)
Tajik League Champion: 1997, 2005
Tajik Cup Champion: 1997, 2008
AFC President's Cup Runner Up: 2006

References

Living people
1963 births
Tajikistani football managers
Soviet footballers
Association footballers not categorized by position